Peter Prendergast may refer to:

Peter Prendergast (referee) (born 1963), Jamaican football referee
Peter Prendergast (artist) (1946–2007), Welsh landscape painter
Peter Prendergast (hurler), Irish hurler